The castra of Hoghiz was a fort in the Roman province of Dacia. The fort was built, in the 2nd century AD, on the left bank of the Olt River, at a place where a Dacian settlement existing already in the 2nd century BC was unearthed. The fort and the nearby village were abandoned in the 3rd century AD. The ruins of the castra are located in Hoghiz, Romania.

See also
List of castra

Notes

External links

STRATEG MAPS - Hoghiz
Roman castra from Romania - Google Maps / Earth

Roman Dacia
Archaeological sites in Romania
Roman legionary fortresses in Romania
Ancient history of Transylvania
Historic monuments in Brașov County